The Cheyenne Botanic Gardens (9 acres, 3.6 ha) are located in Lions Park in Cheyenne, Wyoming, with an associated High Plains Arboretum located five miles (8 km) northwest of Cheyenne at an elevation of .

The gardens began as a vision in 1977 to build a non-profit, solar heated greenhouse. Today, the 6,800 square foot (630 m2) conservatory consists of three greenhouses. The first is filled with tropical plants, herb and cacti gardens and a waterfall pond filled with Koi fish. The second is used primarily for growing vegetables, the third is focused on propagation of bedding plants and flowers for the botanic garden grounds and all flowers for the Cheyenne park system. Outside are many gardens featuring many flowers and cacti.

Climate 

The Cheyenne Botanic Gardens in Cheyenne must deal with one of the more harsh climates in the lower 48 states. Cheyenne ranks #1 in average hail storms (10 per year), 4th in daily average wind speed (daily average 13 mph), has the fewest days with winter snow cover compared with other cities on the central front range of the Rocky Mountains, sits at 6,000 ft. elevation which causes cooler nights making it more difficult to get plants to mature. Cheyenne also has unpredictable late spring and early fall frosts.

The conservatory is 100% solar heated and 50 percent of the conservatory's electricity is also powered by the sun. They are the United States Intermountain West's oldest and one of the largest public demonstration sites for renewable energy.

This botanic garden has received numerous awards related mostly to the innovative way that they do things relating to volunteers and renewable energy. These awards have come from three different United States Presidents: Ronald Reagan, George H. W. Bush (senior) and Bill Clinton. In addition, the founding director, Shane Smith, of the Cheyenne Botanic Gardens was awarded a Loeb Fellowship from Harvard and the Community Hero award from former Governor of Wyoming, Jim Geringer.

Founder 
Shane Smith was the founding Director of the Cheyenne Botanic Gardens and retired in 2018. He planted the first seed in 1977 and has guided the project up to his retirement. Smith is also author of the book Greenhouse Gardener's Companion and works as a greenhouse consultant. Smith has lectured and consulted on the subjects of greenhouse gardening, community greening, horticulture therapy and community based botanic gardens in over 27 states and 3 countries. Smith also had a 39-year long weekly radio program on KFBC in Cheyenne, WY.

Design 
The master plan and many of the designs for the Cheyenne Botanic Gardens were created by landscape architect, Herbert R. Schaal, of the firm EDAW. Herb Schaal is one of the most award-winning landscape architects in the United States and his work tends to focus on public botanical gardens and arboreta. He is also well known for his designs of public children's gardens. Schaal designed the Children's Village at the Cheyenne Botanic Gardens which was scheduled to open in 2009. This design has won two awards and focuses on both sustainability and gardening. Schaal also created the master plan for the High Plains Arboretum.

A moon arch located between the Peace Garden and the Garden Labyrinth, is dedicated to the late Edwina Wiederspahn, wife of former Laramie County Coroner and Community College trustee Arling Wiederspahn (1916-2007).

The grounds have many special garden landscapes including a rose garden, herb garden, Peace garden, water garden, cacti display, annuals and perennials, shade loving plant display  xeriscape and native plants. There is also a wetland display and gardens that depict plants that were important in southeast Wyoming over the past three centuries (called the Rotary Century Plazas). It also has a labyrinth known as the "Garden Labyrinth", which is dedicated to the former Wyoming First Lady, Bobby Hathaway.

Paul Smith Children's Village 
In 2009, after 3 years of fundraising and one year of construction, the Paul Smith Children's Village opened to the public - adjacent to the Cheyenne Botanic Gardens. The almost $2 million raised to construct the garden came through the fundraising efforts of the Friends of the Cheyenne Botanic Gardens foundation and did not involve the use of tax revenues or other public funds. It was named after the late Paul Smith (no relation to the founding director Shane Smith), who was the proprietor of a once notable hotel, Hitching Post Inn. Paul Smith was a long-time supporter of the Cheyenne Botanic Gardens and local philanthropist. The theme of the Paul Smith Children's Garden is sustainability past, present and future. Herbert R. Schaal, a highly awarded landscape architect with AECOM, provided the design for the Children's Village. This design has garnered 2 awards from the Colorado Chapter of the American Association of Landscape architects.

The site for the Children's Village is centered in what used to be a city parks shop. This site included a large native stone garage (now the classroom/laboratory) and rock wall which now surrounds the Children's Village. The garage and wall were constructed in the early 1930s as part of the Works Progress Administration (a depression era job training program).

The High Plains Arboretum 

The High Plains Arboretum operates as part of the Cheyenne Botanic Gardens and is located at the former High Plains Horticulture Research Station. This station was established on March 19, 1928, when Congress authorized the Secretary of Agriculture to establish the Central Great Plains Field Station at or near Cheyenne. In 1930, the site officially became the Cheyenne Horticulture Field Station, and was directed to   concentrate on fruits, vegetables, windbreaks and ornamental plants.

The goal was to find plants that would make the High Plains of the United States more habitable. This station still exists in its original location on a 2,140 acre (870 ha) plot leased from the City of Cheyenne for 199 years at $1 per year. The site also has many historic buildings that include a greenhouse, a number of quaint wood-framed houses which are still used for staff housing, laboratories, storage areas and office space. Maintenance of the site is now provided by the Cheyenne Botanic Gardens and the Cheyenne Urban Forestry which are both under the Cheyenne Parks and Recreation Department.

As a Horticulture Station by 1962 they had tested:

 1,300 varieties of woody ornamental plants including over 100 different types of hedge materials
 200 species of trees and shrubs for dry land wind breaks with over 250 cooperative plantings in various parts of the region served by the station.
 2000 fruit cultivars
 8,000 vegetable cultivars

The work of the Cheyenne Horticultural Field Station came to an end in 1974 when the mission and name was changed by the USDA. From 1975 to 2008 the Arboretum's trees and shrubs relied mainly on natural precipitation, and many have perished. Since 1975 the arboretum has lost over 50% of the plants inventoried, and many more were in severe decline. Late in the summer of 2000, a group of interested participants gathered to begin an effort to "preserve, restore and enhance" the arboretum. This group is now a sub-committee of the Friends of the Cheyenne Botanic Gardens.
They were motivated because there are still many of the trees and shrubs still exist that were once part of the Horticulture Station's landscape and research. The result of the work of the Cheyenne Botanic Gardens and the Friends of the High Plains Arboretum resulted in allowing the USDA to modify its lease with the City of Cheyenne for the return of the  portion to be returned to City operation through guidance of the City of Cheyenne Parks and Recreation's Cheyenne Botanic Gardens and the Friends of the Cheyenne Botanic Gardens and the Division of Urban Forestry.

The Cheyenne Botanic Gardens High Plains Arboretum has a 20-year master-plan developed by noted landscape architect, Herbert R. Schaal, with the goal of creating a public arboretum that works to preserve, restore and enhance the  portion of the station that includes the original remaining research plant testing sites. The High Plains Arboretum is in the beginning stages of development and arrangements can be made to view the site through the Cheyenne Botanic Gardens.

See also 
 List of botanical gardens and arboretums in Wyoming

References 

Botanic Gardens
Botanical gardens in Wyoming
Works Progress Administration in Wyoming
Protected areas of Laramie County, Wyoming
Tourist attractions in Cheyenne, Wyoming